A concordat is a convention between the Holy See and a sovereign state that defines the relationship between the Catholic Church and the state in matters that concern both, i.e. the recognition and privileges of the Catholic Church in a particular country and with secular matters that impact on church interests.

According to P. W. Brown the use of the term "concordat" does not appear "until the pontificate of Pope Martin V (1413–1431) in a work by Nicholas de Cusa, entitled De Concordantia Catholica". The first concordat dates from 1098, and from then to the beginning of the First World War the Holy See signed 74 concordats. Due to the substantial remapping of Europe that took place after the war, new concordats with legal successor states were necessary. The post-World War I era saw the greatest proliferation of concordats in history.

Although for a time after the Second Vatican Council, which ended in 1965, the term 'concordat' was dropped, it reappeared with the Polish Concordat of 1993 and the Portuguese Concordat of 2004. A different mode of relations between the Vatican and various states is still evolving, often contentiously, in the wake of a growing secularism and religious pluralism in the western world.

Church teaching 

The Catholic church historically claimed not to be bound to one form of government over another, but was willing to work with any kind of government, so long as the rights of God and believers were maintained. Pius XI wrote in 1933: Universally known is the fact that the Catholic Church is never bound to one form of government more than to another, provided the Divine rights of God and of Christian consciences are safe. She does not find any difficulty in adapting herself to various civil institutions, be they monarchic or republican, aristocratic or democratic.

Church–state dichotomy 

From a church–state perspective, the contentions regarding concordats involves two perspectives.

From a Catholic perspective, the Church has the moral and theological right to enter into diplomatic relations with states in order to reach agreements regarding the care of its members residing there. This is the concept of Libertas ecclesiae (freedom of the Church).

However, from a non-Catholic perspective, Catholic Church privileges pose certain concerns regarding religious freedom, such as:
 concordats give to the Church a privileged position that other religious groups are denied (European history in numerous books reveals this fact)
 concordats may not be "the same as treaties" because they are entered into by an entity that is both religious and political in nature, viz., the Catholic Church, with exception to states which are expressly atheist or are identified as choosing anti-religious views, whereas any other treaty is regularly between two sovereign entities on a horizontal level, i.e., purely political in nature, and
 depending on the negotiations agreed upon in the concordat, some religious groups face the threat of being marginalized. For example, in Spain, although the Constitution guarantees religious freedom, the Church is mentioned by name, and in practice holds a pre-eminent position among other religious groups. In recent years, debate has occurred regarding whether the Spanish government should maintain a concordat with the Vatican.

Due to these concerns, the United States did not establish diplomatic ties to the Vatican until the Ronald Reagan administration in 1984; and, to this day, the United States does not have a concordat with the Vatican, despite the two having a mutual "compromise" in terms of relationship.

Examples of concordats

 The Concordat of 1801 was an agreement between Napoleon and Pope Pius VII. During the French Revolution, the National Assembly had taken Church properties and issued the Civil Constitution of the Clergy. Subsequent laws abolished Christian holidays. Many religious leaders had either gone into exile or been executed during the Reign of Terror. The Church gave up any claims to lands confiscated after 1790, but secured the right to public worship, subject to any public safety concerns on the part of the local prefect. Napoleon was able to pacify French Catholics, while limiting the papacy's influence in France. While the concordat restored some ties to the papacy, it largely favored the state. Within a year Napoleon unilaterally amended the agreement with the Organic Articles legislating religious practice.

Some concordats guarantee the Catholic Church the tax-exempt status of a charity, being by fact the largest charitable institution in the world, either stating this explicitly, as in Brazil (2008, Article 15) and Italy (1984, Article 7.3), or phrasing it indirectly, as in Portugal (2004, art. 12).

When the political will is present, such concordat privileges can be extended by domestic legislation. In 1992 the tax exemption granted the Church by the Italian concordat was interpreted by a law which permits the Catholic Church to avoid paying 90% of what it owes to the state for its commercial activities. Thus, a small shrine within the walls of a cinema, holiday resort, shop, restaurant or hotel is sufficient to confer religious exemption. In June 2007 Neelie Kroes, the European Commissioner for Competition announced an investigation of this. Then, in August, the deputy finance minister in Romano Prodi's fragile center-left coalition said the issue needed to be tackled in the next year's budget. However, after that nothing more about this was heard from the Barroso Commission and a few months later the Prodi government fell.

The Slovak concordat (2000, art. 20.2) ensures that church offertories are "not subject to taxation or to the requirement of public accountability".

This is also the case in Côte d'Ivoire, where far larger sums are involved. The Basilica at Yamoussoukro, is estimated to have cost $300 million, and the additional running expenses for what is the largest church in the world are also shielded from scrutiny by the 1992 concordat concluded with the Ivorian president. Houphouët-Boigny claimed that these funds came from his private fortune. A Vatican official is reported to have called the agreement over the foundation set up to administer these funds "a delicate matter". Nevertheless, this concordat ensures that the foundation's income and assets remain untaxed (art. 9.1), it holds these funds beyond the reach of both criminal and civil law (art. 7.1), it permits this money to be sent out of the country (art. 13.2) and it keeps all the foundation's documents "inviolable", in other words, secret (art. 8).

In Colombia there was a crisis between state and church in 1994 when Attorney-General Gustavo de Greiff accused several bishops of having illegal contacts with the FARC guerrillas. It turned out that under Colombia's concordat with the Holy See, members of the clergy could only be investigated by ecclesiastical courts which are ruled by canon law, and that the bishops were therefore immune from investigation by the civil authorities on what many in Colombia considered to be a serious felony.

List

There have been at least several hundred concordats over the centuries.
The following is a sortable list of the concordats and other bilateral agreements concluded by the Holy See.

References

Bibliography

Baker, Michael (2010). "Security and the sacred: examining Canada's legal response to the clash of public safety and religious freedom". Touro Law Center: International Law Review, Vol. 13 (1). Available online.
DiMarco, Erica (2009). "The tides of Vatican influence in Italian reproductive matters: from abortion to assisted reproduction". Rutgers Journal of Law and Religion, Vol. 10 (2) Spring. Available online.
Hosack, Kristen A. (2010). "Napoleon Bonaparte's Concordat and the French Revolution". Constructing the Past, Vol. 11 (1), article 5. Available online
Hughes, John Jay (1974). "The Reich Concordat 1933: Capitulation or Compromise?" Australian Journal of Politics & History, 20 (2), pp. 164–175.
Metz, René, "What is Canon Law?" (New York: Hawthorn Books, 1960 [1st Edition])
Petkoff, Peter (2007). "Legal perspectives and religious perspectives of religious rights under international law in the Vatican Concordats (1963–2004)". Law and Justice: The Christian Law Review, 158, p. 30- online (payment may be required).
Plichtová, Jana and Petrjánošová, Magda (2008). "Freedom of religion, institution of conscientious objection and political practice in post-communist Slovakia". Human Affairs, 18 (1), June, pp. 37–51. Available online here.

External links 
 Concordat Watch

History of the papacy
Foreign relations of the Holy See
Religion and politics

Catholic canonical documents
Sources of law
Religious law